WBJB-FM (90.5 FM, "Brookdale Public Radio, 90.5 The Night") is a non-commercial, member-supported, educational public radio station licensed to Brookdale Community College, serving Central New Jersey with "The News You Need and the Music You Love."

DJs and staff
The station's current staff includes Michele McBride, Rich Robinson (former student), Jeff Raspe, Sean Carolan, Stephanie Coskey, Tara Feeley (former student), Stu Coogan (former student), Anthony Fox (former student), Tom Brennan, Megan O'Shea (student), Andrew Maggs (student), and Jaimee Denaro (former student).

Live at The Night Releases
Starting in late 2000, WBJB began releasing "Live At The NIGHT" CDs featuring unique performances from their studios.

As of 2019, 11 CD volumes have been released, and one vinyl record compilation (including a previously unpublished recording of Bruce Springsteen). Each release is limited to one pressing and will never be reissued.

Songwriters Concert Series

Brookdale Public Radio presents a "Songwriters Concert Series" each summer. The shows are free and open to the public. They are held, weather permitting, on the beach in Belmar, New Jersey and were formerly held at Riverside Gardens Park in Red Bank, New Jersey before moving to the 5th Avenue Beach in Belmar in 2013.

HD radio multichannel broadcast
In early March 2010, WBJB announced the broadcast of two multicast channels utilizing HD radio technology.  The two channels are "FM Flashback" on HD2 and "Brookdale Student Radio" on HD3.  Each channel runs 24 hours a day, 7 days a week and are also available via internet streaming.

Altrok Radio began as a feature on Friday nights (Now, called the Altrok Radio FM Showcase) and has become a separate station under the umbrella of Brookdale Public Radio.

Brookdale Student Radio 90.5 HD3 is completely student run, with different students doing their own shifts.

"FM Flashback" is an affiliate of the syndicated Pink Floyd program Floydian Slip.

Format timeline
Mid 1980s–1999: "Jazz & More For The Jersey Shore" (Jazz, NPR News Magazines)
2000–present: "90.5 The Night"

References

External links
 

 WBJB-FM History
 FM Flashback
 Altrok Radio
 BrookdaleStudentRadio.com

BJB-FM
Radio stations established in 1975
Middletown Township, New Jersey
NPR member stations
BJB-FM
Adult album alternative radio stations in the United States
1975 establishments in New Jersey
Brookdale Community College